Protocuspidariidae is a family of bivalves belonging to the superfamily Cuspidarioidea in the superorder Anomalodesmata.

Genera
 Multitentacula Krylova, 1995
 Protocuspidaria Allen & Morgan, 1981

References

 Scarlato O. A. & Starobogatov Y. A. (1983). System of the bivalve molluscs of the superorder Septibranchia. In: Molluscs. Their systematics, ecology and distribution (Likharev I.M., ed.). Seventh meeting on the investigation of molluscs. Leningrad, Nauka pp. 7-14:

Anomalodesmata
Bivalve families